Arachis glabrata (creeping forage peanut, rhizoma peanut, rhizoma perennial peanut, perennial forage peanut, golden glory, ornamental peanut grass) is a high-quality forage plant native to Argentina, Brazil, and Paraguay vegetation. This plant is also used for soil conservation and as an ornamental plant.

It is often cultivated together as a following grass species: Axonopus affinis,  Axonopus fissifolius, Brachiaria decumbens, Cynodon dactylon, Digitaria eriantha, Paspalum nicorae, and Paspalum notatum. These legume species are also cited as a companion species: Aeschynomene villosa, Medicago sativa, and Trifolium repens.

External links
FAO: Arachis glabrata
Tropical Forages: Arachis glabrata
USDA Plants Profile: Arachis glabrata

glabrata
Forages
Flora of Argentina
Flora of Brazil
Flora of southern South America